Denmark women's national softball team is the national team for Denmark. The team competed at the 1998 ISF Women's World Championship in Fujinomiya City, Japan where they finished seventeenth.

References

External links 
 International Softball Federation

Softball
Women's national softball teams
Softball in Denmark